The 1987–88 Biathlon World Cup was a multi-race tournament over a season of biathlon, organised by the UIPMB (Union Internationale de Pentathlon Moderne et Biathlon). The season started on 17 December 1987 in Hochfilzen, Austria, and ended on 20 March 1988 in Jyväskylä, Finland. It was the 11th season of the Biathlon World Cup. The women's European Cup changed its name to World Cup.

The first round of the World Cup in Hochfilzen had scheduled individuals, sprints and relays, but the sprints and relays were cancelled due to heavy rainfall destroying the tracks. The sprint races were later held in Keuruu, with the rest of that World Cup round being held in Jyväskylä.

Calendar
Below is the World Cup calendar for the 1987–88 season.

 1988 Winter Olympics and 1988 World Championship races were not included in the 1987–88 World Cup scoring system.
 The men competed at the 1988 Winter Olympics whilst the women competed at the 1988 World Championships.
 The relays were technically unofficial races as they did not count towards anything in the World Cup.

World Cup Podium

Men

Women

Standings: Men

Overall 

Final standings after 10 races.

Standings: Women

Overall 

Final standings after 10 races.

Achievements
First World Cup career victory
, 26, in his 7th season — the WC 2 Individual in Antholz-Anterselva; first podium was 1982–83 Individual in Holmenkollen
, 25, in his 5th season — the WC 3 Individual in Ruhpolding; first podium was 1986–87 Individual in Ruhpolding
, 24, in his 4th season — the WC 3 Sprint in Ruhpolding; it also was his first podium
, 24, in his 5th season — the WC 4 Individual in Holmenkollen; first podium was 1985–86 Sprint in Antholz-Anterselva
, 25, in his 6th season — the WC 5 Sprint (2) in Jyväskylä; first podium was 1986–87 Sprint in Obertauern

First World Cup podium
, 22, in his 3rd season — no. 3 in the WC 2 Individual in Antholz-Anterselva
, 23, in his 4th season — no. 3 in the WC 4 Sprint in Holmenkollen
, 22, in his 1st season — no. 2 in the WC 5 Sprint (1) in Jyväskylä

Victory in this World Cup (all-time number of victories in parentheses)
, 2 (9) first places
, 2 (9) first places
, 1 (5) first place
, 1 (1) first place
, 1 (1) first place
, 1 (1) first place
, 1 (1) first place
, 1 (1) first place

Retirements
The following notable biathletes retired after the 1987–88 season:

Notes 
1.  The Aftenposten source placed Løberg 17th with 70 points.

References

Biathlon World Cup
World Cup
World Cup